The Clifton Heights Orange and Black was a professional football team from Clifton Heights, Pennsylvania, a town located just to the southwest of Philadelphia, from 1921 until around 1932. The team was operated by the Clifton Heights Athletic Association to compete against the other towns of Delaware County. The team was managed by James E. Gallagher and coached by Rusty Yarnell, who also played with the team for a number of years. The Orange and Black consistently fielded strong teams that drew the attention of competitive clubs from neighboring Philadelphia, New Jersey and Delaware. The Orange & Black even played the Frankford Yellow Jackets and Pottsville Maroons of the early National Football League.

In 1926 Clifton Heights joined the newly formed Eastern League of Professional Football. However, the team soon dropped out of the league on October 13, 1926 due to a $1500 debt incurred during a span of just three weeks from their association with the league. Soon after the Orange and Black returned to the independent ranks until around 1932 when the team is thought to have folded. The pro football archives show no data for the Orange and Black after their 1932 season.

The Orange and Black won Delaware County Titles in 1922 and 1923.

References
Ghosts of the Gridiron, Virtual Scrapbook Library, Vol. 2: Clifton Heights Orange & Black
Pro Football Archives 1932
Public Ledger Philadelphia, PA November 20, 1922
Public Ledger Philadelphia, PA December 10, 1923
Evening Public Ledger Phila, PA November 19, 1925
Philadelphia Record October 14, 1926

Notes

History of Pennsylvania
Defunct American football teams in Pennsylvania
Early professional American football teams in Pennsylvania
American football teams established in 1921
Sports clubs disestablished in 1932
1921 establishments in Pennsylvania
1932 disestablishments in Pennsylvania